Joy Tanner (born March 7, 1966) is an American-born Canadian actress, who is known for roles such as George Fayne in the 1995 Nancy Drew TV series, Jill Stone in Cold Squad, and Nora McDonald Venturi in four seasons of the sitcom Life with Derek and its movie finale Vacation with Derek. She also provided the voice of Candy Kong in the animated television series Donkey Kong Country.

Life and career
Tanner is part Native American, of the Seneca Nation and she is adopted. Information on her birthplace varies, some sources state she was born in Rochester, New York while others, including IMDb, state she was born in Buffalo, New York.

Tanner earned an honors B.A. from SUNY Potsdam, worked with Tony Award-winning director Warren Enters at SUNY Buffalo and has her diploma from the British America Drama Academy (London and Oxford, UK).

After moving to Canada, she began her career in film. She augmented her acting career with commercials in Canada and was the star in the Shoppers Drug Mart and Pharmacy commercials also playing Wonder Woman in a Listerine spot (1998–2000). She was nominated for a Gemini Award in 2007 for her guest role on ReGenesis in the episode "Let It Burn". She also has a recurring role on Degrassi as Mrs. Coyne.

Tanner was pregnant with her son during the filming of the first season of the Family Channel sitcom Life With Derek, in which she portrayed Nora MacDonald.  She gave birth in 2005.

Filmography

Film

Television

References

External links

American people of Canadian descent
Canadian television actresses
Actresses from Rochester, New York
1966 births
Living people
American emigrants to Canada
Pittsford Mendon High School alumni
State University of New York at Potsdam alumni
Native American actresses
20th-century First Nations people
21st-century First Nations people
20th-century Canadian actresses